(Wenche) Sahra Hausmann (born 6 February 1973) is a Norwegian team handball player who played for the club Bækkelagets SK and on the Norway women's national handball team. She became World champion at World Women's Handball Championship in 1999, won silver medal at the World Women's Handball Championship in 1997, and became European champion in 1998. She competed at the 1996 Summer Olympics in Atlanta, where Norway finished 4th.

Hausmann made her debut on the national team in 1993. She scored more than 150 goals for the national team during her career.

References

External links

1973 births
Living people
Norwegian female handball players
Olympic handball players of Norway
Handball players at the 1996 Summer Olympics
Handball players from Oslo
20th-century Norwegian women